Pavan Deshpande (born 16 September 1989) is an Indian first-class cricketer who plays for Puducherry. He made his first-class debut for Karnataka in the 2016-17 Ranji Trophy on 7 December 2016. He made his List A debut for Karnataka in the 2016–17 Vijay Hazare Trophy on 25 February 2017. In January 2018, he was bought by the Royal Challengers Bangalore in the 2018 IPL auction. In the 2020 IPL auction, he was bought by the Royal Challengers Bangalore ahead of the 2020 Indian Premier League.

References

External links
 

1989 births
Living people
Indian cricketers
Karnataka cricketers
Royal Challengers Bangalore cricketers
People from Dharwad
Pondicherry cricketers